{{DISPLAYTITLE:Upsilon4 Eridani}}

Upsilon4 Eridani is a close binary star system in the constellation Eridanus. It is visible to the naked eye with an apparent visual magnitude of 3.56.

This is a double-lined spectroscopic binary star system, which means that the Doppler-shifted spectral lines of both components can be distinguished. The pair have a circular orbit with a period of five days. The system is composed of two B-type main-sequence stars: one has a stellar classification of B8V and the other B9.5V. Both stars show HgMn peculiarities in their spectrum, and their properties are nearly identical. The spin rate of the two stars is synchronized to their orbital period. It is possible that a nearby K-type star is also related.

References

Eridanus (constellation)
B-type main-sequence stars
Eridani, Upsilon4
Eridani, 41
027376
020042
01347
Spectroscopic binaries
Durchmusterung objects